Tommy is a soundtrack album by The Who with contributions from numerous artists. The soundtrack was used in the 1975 Tommy film that was based on the original album that was released by The Who in 1969. Pete Townshend oversaw the production of this double-LP recording that returned the music to its rock roots, and on which the unrecorded orchestral arrangements he had envisaged for the original Tommy LP were realised by the extensive use of synthesiser. 

The soundtrack LP also employed many leading sessions musicians including Caleb Quaye, Phil Chen and Nicky Hopkins (who also receives a "Special Thanks" in the album credits for help with the arrangements) as well as members of The Faces' Ronnie Wood and future Keith Moon replacement Kenney Jones. The song "Pinball Wizard", performed by Elton John, was a major hit when released as a single. Although the music for this song is performed by "The Elton John Band", as he was calling his musical team, the film depicts John being backed by The Who (dressed in pound-note suits). According to the album's back cover credits, the song was the only one not produced by Townshend, helmed instead by Elton's producer, Gus Dudgeon.
Townshend performs additional synthesizer and/or guitar on all tracks. Credits to "The Who" indicate performances by Townshend, John Entwistle and Moon jointly, regardless of vocalist.

Track listing
All songs are written and composed by Pete Townshend, except where noted. (For narrative, see Tommy (1975 film).)

Personnel
The Who comprises the skeleton band for most of the songs. All instrumentation (both credited and uncredited) on each song is by them, except for additional or alternate musicians indicated below for individual songs in which the lineup is wholly or partially different. Six tracks have The Who as their explicit instrumental credits. Lead vocals are as indicated in track listing above.

The Who:

Roger Daltrey – vocals for (grown up) "Tommy" ("Young Tommy" by Alison Dowling)

John Entwistle – bass, brass overdubs

Keith Moon – drums, vocals for "Uncle Ernie"

Pete Townshend – guitars, synthesizers, keyboards, drums, vocals for "Narrator"

"Overture from Tommy"
The Who

"Prologue - 1945"
John Entwistle – brass overdubs

Pete Townshend – all other instruments

"Captain Walker/It's a Boy" 
Pete Townshend – all instruments

"Bernie's Holiday Camp"
The Who

"1951/What about the Boy?" 
Nicky Hopkins – piano

Mike Kellie – drums

Mick Ralphs, Caleb Quaye – guitar

Chris Stainton – organ

"Amazing Journey" 
Phil Chen – bass

Nicky Hopkins – piano

Tony Newman – drums

"Christmas" 
Nicky Hopkins – piano

Vocal chorus – backing vocals

"Eyesight to the Blind"
Eric Clapton – vocals and guitar

Kenney Jones – drums

Arthur Brown—vocals

"Acid Queen"

Tina Turner – vocals

Kenney Jones – drums

Nicky Hopkins – piano

Ronnie Wood – guitar

"Do You Think It's Alright?" (1, 2, and 3)
Phil Chen – bass

Graham Deakin – drums

Nicky Hopkins – piano

Alan Ross – acoustic guitar

"Cousin Kevin"
Tony Newman – drums

Dave Wintour – bass

"Fiddle About"
The Who

"Sparks"
The Who

"Extra, Extra, Extra"
Kenney Jones – drums

Alan Ross – acoustic guitar

Tony Stevens – bass

"Pinball Wizard"
Elton John – lead vocals and piano

Davey Johnstone – guitar

Dee Murray – bass

Nigel Olsson – drums

Ray Cooper – percussion

"Champagne"
The Who

"There's a Doctor"
Kenney Jones – drums

Alan Ross – acoustic guitar

Chris Stainton – piano

Ronnie Wood – guitar

"Go to the Mirror"
Richard Bailey – drums

Phil Chen – bass

Nicky Hopkins – piano

Caleb Quaye – guitar

"Tommy, Can You Hear Me?"
Nicky Hopkins – piano

Alan Ross, Chris Stainton – acoustic guitar

"Smash the Mirror!"
Kenney Jones – drums

Alan Ross – acoustic guitar

"I'm Free"
Nicky Hopkins – piano

Kenney Jones – drums

"Mother and Son"
Pete Townshend – all instruments

"Sensation"
Phil Chen – bass

Nicky Hopkins – piano

Alan Ross – acoustic guitar

"Miracle Cure"
Kenney Jones – drums

Alan Ross – acoustic guitar

Tony Stevens – bass

"Sally Simpson"
Phil Chen – bass

Eric Clapton – guitar

Graham Deakin – drums

Nicky Hopkins – piano

"Welcome"
Pete Townshend – all instruments

"T.V. Studio"
Pete Townshend – all instruments

"Tommy's Holiday Camp"
Gerald Shaw – organ

"We're Not Gonna Take It"
Nicky Hopkins – piano

Mike Kelly – drums

Alan Ross – acoustic guitar

Fuzzy Samuels – bass

Chris Stainton – organ

Caleb Quaye – guitar

Vocal chorus – backing vocals

"See Me, Feel Me/Listening to You"
The Who, plus:

Nicky Hopkins – piano

Chris Stainton – organ

Vocal chorus – backing vocals

Charts

Weekly charts

Year-end charts

Certifications

References

The Who soundtracks
1975 soundtrack albums
Polydor Records soundtracks
Pete Townshend
Tommy (rock opera)
Fantasy film soundtracks
Drama film soundtracks